David Feliuai is a Samoan rugby union player, currently playing for the . His preferred position is centre or wing.

Early career
Originally from Auckland, New Zealand, Feliuai grew up in Brisbane and represented Sunnybank. In 2018, he took part in an NFL International Combine on the Gold Coast.

Professional career
Feliuai first professional appearances came in the 2019 Global Rapid Rugby season when he represented Kafiga Samoa. In July 2019, he moved to Romania, signing for Baia Mare on a five-year deal. He was named as Baia Mare's third best player of the 2021 season, before returning to Australia early at the end of 2021.

References

External links
itsrugby.co.uk Profile

1997 births
Living people
Samoan rugby union players
New Zealand rugby union players
Australian rugby union players
Rugby union centres
Rugby union wings
CSM Știința Baia Mare players
Melbourne Rebels players
Rugby union players from Auckland
Samoan expatriate rugby union players
Expatriate rugby union players in Romania